Dioscorea sericea (common names: wild yam, colic-root, rheumatism-root) is a type of climbing tuberous geophyte in the family Dioscoreaceae. It is native to Colombia and Peru.

References

sericea